The 2010 Grand Prix de Denain was the 52nd edition of the Grand Prix de Denain cycle race and was held on 15 April 2010. The race started and finished in Denain. The race was won by Denis Flahaut.

General classification

References

2010
2010 in road cycling
2010 in French sport